Sagasi-Deybuk is a rural locality (a selo) and the administrative centre of Sagasi-Deybuksky Selsoviet, Kayakentsky District, Republic of Dagestan, Russia. The population was 1,986 as of 2010. There are 24 streets.

Geography 
Sagasi-Deybuk is located 29 km northwest of Novokayakent (the district's administrative centre) by road. Karanayaul and Pervomayskoye are the nearest rural localities.

Nationalities 
Dagins and Kumyks live there.

References 

Rural localities in Kayakentsky District